Hungama in Dubai is a 2007 Hindi comedy film directed by Masood Ali and starring Aziz Naser, Dheer Charan Srivastav, and Mast Ali in part of a series of movies based on the Hyderabadi lingo theme that followed The Angrez and Hyderabad Nawabs.

Plot
Ajju and Mujju (Mast Ali and Aziz Naser) are crooks who've just got out of jail after a 7-year stint. Most people who have gotten out of jail want to forget the past and look forward to a completely new future, and Ajju and Mujju are no different – they want to completely forget the petty crimes they committed, and aim for really big-time fraud now. And so they land a chai shop owner Nawab Sahab (Dheer Charan Srivastav) and trick him into selling off all his property for Rs. 20 million, promising him they'll make a huge movie with it and make him really rich.

The trio land in Dubai for the "shooting". Meanwhile, Ajju and Mujju live life lavishly for a few days, checking into the most expensive of hotels, throwing wads of dollars into club dancers, and generally exhausting money even faster than their liveliness. Nawab Sahab is thus conned by then and is slow to realize what is happening. As the film progresses, there's a romance between Mujju and an Indian girl (Swetha Khanduri) in Dubai and also Ajju has an affair with an Indian girl looking for a job who has landed in Dubai.

As the trio start realizing that they are running out of money, the relationships start changing. Ajju and Mujju dump Nawab. Soon they discover a bag full of money which they... Later in the movie is a chase scene depicting the trio. The movie featured some good song sequences and excellent locations in and around Dubai.

Cast
 Aziz Naser as Mujju
 Dheer Charan Srivastav as Nawab Sahab
 Mast Ali as Ajju
 Matten Khan
 Sweta Khanduri as Nisha
 Hena as Sonia

Reception
The Hindu reviewer praised the film, writing "Hungama In Dubai is the most entertaining comedy, I’ve ever seen. I might sound pompous and perhaps a bit hasty to make that judgement, but this film went beyond my expectations".

References

External links
 

2007 films
Indian comedy films
Films set in Dubai
Urdu-language Indian films